The 2020 Austin Gilgronis season was the 3rd in the clubs history since their entry to the Major League Rugby in 2017. The 2020 season is the program's first season under the name Austin Gilgronis. Brent Semmons was the coach of the club for the first year. Zinzan Elan-Puttick was the captain the club for the first year as well. The season was later canceled in March due to the COVID-19 pandemic.

The Gilgronis played their home matchups at Bold Stadium in Austin, Texas for the first time since playing in Round Rock the past two seasons. The program used an alternate stadium to host a game in San Antonio at Toyota Field.

Schedule

Standings

References

Austin Gilgronis seasons
Austin
2020 in sports in Texas